Mike Gribbon is a retired American soccer defender who spent two seasons in the North American Soccer League.

Gribbon attended Clemson University, playing on the men's soccer team from 1975 to 1979.  In 1979, the Tigers finished runner-up in the NCAA Men's Division I Soccer Championship.  In 1980, the New England Tea Men selected Gribbon in the first round (second overall) of the American Soccer League draft.  He scored his only goal with the team in his first game and quickly became a regular on the back line.  In 1981, the team moved to Jacksonville, Florida and became the Jacksonville Tea Men.  Gribbon played two games for the relocated Tea Men.

References

External links
 NASL stats

1951 births
Living people
American soccer players
Clemson Tigers men's soccer players
Jacksonville Tea Men players
New England Tea Men players
North American Soccer League (1968–1984) players
North American Soccer League (1968–1984) indoor players
People from Amityville, New York
Association football defenders